Arthur Matthias Beaupre (July 29, 1853 – September 13, 1919) was an American diplomat. He served in several ambassadorships, including Colombia, Argentina, the Netherlands, Luxembourg, and Cuba.

Early life
Beaupre was born in Oswego, Illinois on July 29, 1853.  His family moved to DeKalb County when he was a boy, and at age 16 Beaupre started work as a printer for the Dekalb County News newspaper and advanced through several positions to become a reporter.

Career
In 1874, Beaupre relocated to Aurora, Illinois, studied law, and attained admission to the bar.  A Republican, shortly afterwards he was elected Clerk of the City Court.  He won election to a second term, but before it began he resigned to accept the position of Deputy Clerk for Kane County.  In 1886, Beaupre was elected Kane County Clerk, and in 1890 he was reelected to a second four-year term.

Diplomatic career
After leaving the Clerk's office, in 1897 Beaupre embarked on a career as a diplomat when he was appointed U.S. Consul in Guatemala City, Guatemala, where he served until 1899.  In 1900, he was appointed Consul in Bogota, Colombia.

Beaupre was appointed Minister to Colombia in 1903 and he served until 1904, when he was named Minister to Argentina.

From 1908 to 1911 Beaupre served as both Minister to the Netherlands and Minister to Luxembourg.  In 1911 he was appointed as Minister to Cuba, where he served until retiring in 1913.

Personal life
On October 20, 1880, Beaupre was married to Mary Marsh (1863–1947), the daughter of Charles Wesley Marsh.  Her father and her uncle, William Wallace Marsh, started Marsh, Steward & Company and were responsible for the invention and patent of a reaper-harvester. They were the parents of one child:

 Beatrice Beaupre (b. 1884).

Beaupre died in Chicago, Illinois on September 13, 1919, two days after suffering a stroke.  He is buried in Graceland Cemetery.

References

External links
Arthur Matthias Beaupre at Office of the Historian, U.S. Department of State

1853 births
1919 deaths
People from Oswego, Illinois
People from DeKalb County, Illinois
Lawyers from Chicago
Illinois lawyers
Illinois Republicans
Ambassadors of the United States to Colombia
Ambassadors of the United States to Argentina
Ambassadors of the United States to the Netherlands
Ambassadors of the United States to Luxembourg
Ambassadors of the United States to Cuba
People from Aurora, Illinois
19th-century American lawyers
20th-century American diplomats